John Grenville Stezaker (born 1949) is a British conceptual artist.

Biography and career
Stezaker attended the Slade School of Art in London in his early teens, he graduated with a Higher Diploma in Fine Art in 1973. In the early 1970s, he was among the first wave of British conceptual artists to react against what was then the predominance of Pop art.

Solo exhibitions for Stezaker were rare for sometime, however, in the mid-2000s, his work was rediscovered by the art market; he is now collected by several international collectors and museums.

His work is surreal in tone and is often made using collage and the appropriation of pre-existing images such as postcards, film stills, and publicity photographs. Art historian Julian Stallabrass said, "The contrast at the heart of these works [by Stezaker] is not between represented and real, but between the unknowing primitives of popular culture, and the conscious, ironic artist and viewer of post-modern images." One work included in an exhibition at Salama-Caro Gallery, London, in 1991, depicted an image of a punch clock together with the caption "Why Spend Time on an Exhibition Like This?" Colin Gleadell wrote in The Daily Telegraph in 2007 that Stezaker "is now being hailed as a major influence on the Young British Art movement," in reference to Young British Artists.

Until 2006, Stezaker was Senior Tutor in Critical and Historical Studies at the Royal College of Art in London.

Solo exhibitions
 Works, 1969–1971, Sigi Krauss Gallery, London, 1970. Catalogue available.
 Beyond Art for Art’s Sake: a Propus Mundus, Nigel Greenwood Gallery, London, 1972. Catalogue available.
 The Museum of Modern Art Oxford, 1973
 Nigel Greenwood Gallery, London, 1973.
 Galerie Decembre, Munster, 1974
 Galleria Lia Rumma, Rome, 1974
 Galleria Lia Rumma, Naples, 1974
 Nigel Greenwood Gallery, London, 1975
 Galerie Éric Fabre, Paris, 1975
 Nigel Greenwood Gallery, London, 1976
 Trois Oeuvres [Three Works], Galerie Éric Fabre, Paris, 1976. Catalogue available.
 Dream Allegories. John Stezaker Collages 1976-1977. Nigel Greenwood Gallery, London, 1977. Catalogue available.
 Galerie Éric Fabre, Paris, 1977
 Schema Gallery, Florence, 1977
 Spectro Arts, Newcastle, UK, 1977
 Fragments, The Photographers' Gallery, London, 1978. Catalogue available.
 Collages, 1977–1978, Ikon Gallery, Birmingham, 1978. Catalogue available.
 Southampton City Museum, Southampton, UK, 1978
 Galerie Éric Fabre, Paris, 1979
 Werke 1973-1978, Kuntsmueum Luzern, Kunstmuseum, Lucerne, Switzerland, 1979. Catalogue available.

Selected publications
 John Stezaker: Marriage. Ridinghouse, 2007. With an essay by Cecilia Järdemar. 
 John Stezaker: Masks. Ridinghouse in association with The Approach, 2008.
 The 3rd Person Archive, John Stezaker. Koenig Books, 2009.
 John Stezaker: Tabula Rasa. Ridinghouse in association with The Approach, 2010.
 John Stezaker: Silk Screens. Ridinghouse, 2010. Caoimhín Mac Giolla Léith.
 John Stezaker. Ridinghouse, 2011. Published to accompany an exhibition at Whitechapel Gallery, London
 John Stezaker: Film Still. Ridinghouse, 2011. With text and interview between David Campany and the artist.
 John Stezaker: Nude and Landscape. Ridinghouse in association with Rosenwald-Wolf Gallery, Philadelphia, 2013.
 John Stezaker: One on One. Ridinghouse in association with Tel Aviv Museum of Art, 2013.

References

External links

Stezaker's profile at his gallery, The Approach
The Saatchi Gallery: John Stezaker
Guardian: Artist of the week 72 (02/2010)
Interview with John Stezaker by Andrew Warstat : Parallax, Volume 16, Issue 2 May 2010 , pages 68 - 78
Newman on John Stezaker : Parallax, Volume 16, Issue 2 May 2010 , pages 79 - 86
The Whitechapel Gallery: John Stezaker

British conceptual artists
1949 births
Artists from Worcester, England
Alumni of the Slade School of Fine Art
Academics of the Royal College of Art
Living people
English contemporary artists